Wilfred Kanu Jr. (born August 11, 1977), is also known by his stage name Freddy Will, is an American Canadian author, philanthropist and hip-hop recording artist of Sierra Leone origin. He is the author of three self-published books published with accompanying hip-hop albums.

Early life
Freddy Will was born at the Brookland Maternity Center in Brookfields, Freetown, Sierra Leone. He is the eldest son of Amb. Leeroy Wilfred Kabs Kanu ESQ, former Plenipotentiary Minister of Sierra Leone to the United Nations and publisher of Sierra Leone's widely read Cocorioko newspaper. He was naturalized in the United States and Canada.

Toronto, Canada
In 2006 Freddy Will traveled to Toronto, Canada to record his debut album. After revisiting the country a few times, he filed for permanent residency there. While living there he recorded a mixtape, two additional independent studio albums, an EP and released them off his independent record labels, Ghetto Breed Entertainment, and Swift Nightz Entertainment. He also started his freelance writing career, launched his blog website, and authored three books that were self-published by Soul Asylum Poetry & Publishing, as well as his publishing company, Freddy Will Publishing in Ontario, Canada.
 All three books were self-published in a book plus album concomitant. He also launched The Freddy Will Hope Foundation.

Literary, music, and theater influences
During his interview with award-winning Ghanaian journalist, Jefferson Sackey, Freddy Will stated that he started rapping when he was still living in Liberia. He credited Kool Moe Dee, LL Cool J., Queen Latifah, Ice-T, Naughty By Nature, legendary Sierra Leone rapper, Jimmy B, Dr. Dre, Tupac Shakur, Scarface, Snoop Dogg, The Notorious B. I. G., Nas, The Luniz and the LOX as some of his primary musical influences in hip-hop. For his writing, he credits his father, John Grisham, Shakespeare, Langston Hughes, Caresse Crosby, Maya Angelou and Pacesetter Novels as his primary influences and Idris Elba, Ice Cube, John Singleton and Spike Lee, his influences in theater and film.

Healthy Food For Thought: Good Enough to Eat

In 2010, Freddy Will was among several musicians, music producers, spoken word artists, chefs and children's book authors who participated in a children's compilation album consisting of 60 selections of prose, poems, and songs about food, nutrition, and self-awareness that can be used as part of a childhood obesity awareness curriculum and to promote awareness for Type 2 Diabetes among school children. This album was executive produced in Philadelphia by the New York Coalition for Healthy School Foods. In 2011, the Recording Academy nominated the Double CD charity album for a Grammy Award.

Discography

Albums
 While I'm Still Young – The Talking Drums (2008)
 Dark Horse From Romarong – a city of kings (2010) 
 Laboramus Exspectantes Vol. 1 (2014)

Mixed albums
 While I'm Still Young – The Talking Drums 1.2v (2009)
 Views From The 7 (2017)
 African Black: The Unreleased Anthems & Ballads – (2020)

EP
 City of Kings: RELOADED (2012)

Mixtape
 Stay True (2006)

Collaboration
 Healthy Food for Thought: Good Enough to Eat (2010)

Bibliography

Novels
 My Book of Chrymes – released August 11, 2009 (ISBN 0-981-21601-3) 
 The Dark Road from Romarong – released on October 10, 2010 (ISBN 1-926-87609-1) 
 Hip Hop Kruzade – Path of a Legend – published November 22, 2014 (ISBN 1-926-87650-4)

eBooks
 The Sandmann's Journal Vol. 1 – published June 6, 2016 (ISBN 1-483-57305-2) 
 The Sandmann's Journal Vol. 2 – published November 15, 2016 (ISBN 978-1-483-58654-0) 
 The Sandmann's Journal Vol. 3 – published August 8, 2018 (ISBN 978-1-644-40966-4) 
 The Sandmann's Journal Vol. 4 – published October 10, 2018 (ISBN 978-1-644-67715-5) 
 The Sandmann's Journal Vol. 5 – published March 5, 2019 (ISBN 978-1-645-16095-3) 
 Crime Rhymez: Tenth Anniversary Edition of My Book of Chrymes – published August 26, 2019 (ISBN 978-1-646-69579-9) 
 The Sandmann's Journal Vol. 6 – published February 22, 2020 (ISBN 978-1-648-26437-5)

Grammy Awards

References

Living people
1977 births
People from Freetown
Canadian male non-fiction writers
Canadian philanthropists
Canadian activists
Canadian male rappers
21st-century Canadian rappers
Black Canadian musicians
Black Canadian writers
Sierra Leonean emigrants to Canada
21st-century Canadian male musicians